Cleo TV (stylized as CLEOTV) is an American cable television network owned by Urban One. The network serves young millennial and Generation X African American women, and serves as a complement to TV One. The network officially launched on January 19, 2019, after a week-long soft-launch period highlighting its programming offerings. At launch, Comcast Xfinity and Charter Spectrum served as the network's main debut base.

The network's programming is mainly made up of lifestyle programming, syndicated sitcoms and dramas, and Black film telecasts.

References

External links
Official website

TV One (American TV channel)
Urban One
Television networks in the United States
Television channels and stations established in 2019
African-American television
African-American television networks